Joseph McGrath (12 August 1888 – 26 March 1966) was an Irish politician and businessman. He was a Sinn Féin and later a Cumann na nGaedheal Teachta Dála (TD) for various constituencies; Dublin St James's (1918–1921), Dublin North West (1921–1923) and Mayo North (1923–1924), and developed widespread business interests.

Political career

McGrath was born in Dublin in 1888. By 1916 he was working with his brother George at Craig Gardiner & Co., a firm of accountants in Dawson Street, Dublin. He worked with Michael Collins, a part-time fellow clerk and the two struck up a friendship. In his spare time McGrath worked as secretary for the Volunteer Dependents' Fund.

He soon joined the Irish Republican Brotherhood. He fought in Marrowbone Lane in the 1916 Easter Rising. McGrath was arrested after the rising, and jailed in Wormwood Scrubs and Brixton prisons in England. In the 1918 general election, he was elected as Sinn Féin TD for the Dublin St James's constituency, later sitting in the First Dáil. He was also a member of the Irish Republican Army, the guerrilla army of the Irish Republic, and successfully organised many bank robberies during the Irish war of Independence (1919–1921), where a small percentage of the proceeds was retained as a reward by him and his fellow-soldiers. During this time he was interred briefly at Ballykinlar Internment Camp. He escaped by dressing in army uniform and walking out of the gate with soldiers going on leave. He was eventually recaptured and spent time in jail in Belfast.

In October 1921 McGrath travelled with the Irish Treaty delegation to London as one of Michael Collins' personal staff. When the Provisional Government of Ireland was set up in January 1922, McGrath was appointed as Minister for Labour. In the Irish Civil War of 1922–1923, he took the pro-treaty side and was made Director of Intelligence, replacing Liam Tobin.  In a strongly worded letter, written in red ink, McGrath warned Collins not to take his last, ill-fated trip to Cork.

He was later put in charge of the police Intelligence service of the new Irish Free State, the Criminal Investigation Department or CID. It was modelled on the London Metropolitan Police department of the same name, but was accused of the torture and killing of a number of republican (anti-treaty) prisoners during the civil war. It was disbanded at the war's end; the official reason given was that it was unnecessary for a police force in peacetime. McGrath went on to serve as Minister for Labour in the Second Dáil and the Provisional Government of Ireland. He also served in the 1st and 2nd Executive Councils holding the Industry and Commerce portfolio.

In September 1922 McGrath used strikebreakers to oppose a strike by Trade Unionists in the Post Office service, despite having threatened to resign in the previous March of the same year when the government threatened to use British strikebreakers.

In December 1922 McGrath was a reluctant supporter of the government's decision to execute four high profile IRA prisoners; Liam Mellows, Dick Barrett, Rory O'Connor, and Joe McKelvey.

Army Mutiny, Resignation, National Party

McGrath resigned from office in April 1924 because of dissatisfaction with the government's attitude to the Army Mutiny officers and as he said himself, "government by a clique and by the officialdom of the old regime". By this he meant that former IRA fighters were being overlooked and that the Republican goals on all Ireland had been sidelined. McGrath and eight other TDs who had resigned from Cumann na nGaedheal then resigned their seats in the Dáil and formed a new political party, the National Party. However, the new party did not contest the subsequent by-elections for their old seats. Instead, Cumann na nGaedheal won seven of the seats and Sinn Féin won the other two.

Accusation of involvement in the death of Noel Lemass
In 1927, McGrath took a libel case against the publishers of The Real Ireland by poet Cyril Bretherton, a book that claimed McGrath was responsible for the abduction and murder of Noel Lemass (the brother of Seán Lemass) in June 1923 during the civil war, as well as a subsequent coverup. McGrath won the court case. During the 1930s, McGrath and Seán Lemass reconciled and regularly played poker together.

Business interests
Following his political career, he went on to become involved in the building trade. In 1925 he became labour adviser to Siemens-Schuckert, German contractors for the Ardnacrusha hydro-electric scheme near Limerick. McGrath founded the Irish Hospitals' Sweepstake in 1930, and the success of its sweepstakes made him an extremely wealthy man. He had other extensive and successful business interests always investing in Ireland and became Ireland's best-known racehorse owner and breeder, winning The Derby with Arctic Prince in 1951.

Personal life
McGrath died at his home, Cabinteely House, in Dublin on 26 March 1966. Cabinteely House, was donated to the state in 1986, and the land developed as a public park. Joseph's son Patrick W. McGrath inherited many of his father's business interests, and also served as Fine Gael Senator from 1973 to 1977.

References

External links
 

 

1888 births
1966 deaths
Burials at Deans Grange Cemetery
Businesspeople from County Dublin
Cumann na nGaedheal TDs
Early Sinn Féin TDs
Irish Directorate of Intelligence personnel
Irish racehorse owners and breeders
Irish Republican Army (1919–1922) members
Members of the Parliament of the United Kingdom for County Dublin constituencies (1801–1922)
Members of the 1st Dáil
Members of the 2nd Dáil
Members of the 3rd Dáil
Members of the 4th Dáil
Members of the Irish Republican Brotherhood
Owners of Epsom Derby winners
Politicians from County Dublin
People of the Irish Civil War (Pro-Treaty side)
UK MPs 1918–1922
Ministers for Enterprise, Trade and Employment